was a Japanese domain of the Edo period, located in Musashi Province (modern-day Kisai, Saitama). The domain existed until 1632, when the last lord, Ōkubo Tadamoto, was moved to the Kanō Domain, and the Kisai holdings were then merged into the territory of the Kawagoe Domain.

List of lords

Matsui-Matsudaira clan (Fudai; 20,000 koku)

Yasushige

Ōkubo clan (Fudai; 20,000 koku)

Tadatsune
Tadamoto

References

Domains of Japan
Matsui-Matsudaira clan
Ōkubo clan